Diamantina Cocktail is the third studio album by the Australian rock group Little River Band, released in May 1977. It peaked at No. 2 on the Australian Kent Music Report Albums Chart and reaching No. 49 on the Billboard 200. The album was certified Gold in the U.S. by the RIAA in January 1978 for over 500,000 copies sold.

The titled refers to a drink invented in the area of the Diamantina River in Queensland, Australia. It consists of Bundaberg Rum, condensed milk and an emu egg.

Singles
 "Help Is on Its Way" was released as the album's lead single in April 1977. The song peaked at number 1 in Australia and number 14 in the United States.
 "Witchery" was released in Australia and New Zealand in July 1977 as the album's second single. It peaked at number 33 in Australia.
 "Home on Monday" was released in October 1977 as the album's third single. It peaked at number 73 in Australia and number 12 in The Netherlands.
 "Happy Anniversary" was released in December 1977 in Europe and in January 1978 in the United States as the album's fourth and final single. The song peaked at number 16 in the United States.

Reception
Cash Box magazine said "Thought the singers in this Aussie band justifiably deserve the spotlight aimed their way, the instrumental setting creates the perfect backdrop for the self-written selection."

Track listing

Australian version 
Side A
"Help Is on Its Way" (Glenn Shorrock) – 4:06
"The Drifter" (Graham Goble) – 3:53
"L.A. in the Sunshine" (David Briggs, Shorrock) – 3:07
"The Inner Light" (Goble) – 3:31

Side B
"Witchery" (Beeb Birtles, Goble) – 2:48
"Home on Monday" (Birtles, Shorrock) – 3:53
"Happy Anniversary" (Birtles, Briggs) – 4:04
"Raelene, Raelene" (Birtles) – 4:27
"Changed and Different" (Goble) – 4:02

Bonus tracks
"Days on the Road" (version 2) (Goble) – 5:24 (bonus track on 2010 remaster)
"Take Me Home" (version 2) (Birtles) – 5:08 (bonus track on 2010 remaster)

International version 
Side A
"Help Is on Its Way" (Shorrock) – 4:06
"Days on the Road" (Goble) – 4:54
"Happy Anniversary" (Birtles, Briggs) – 4:04
"Another Runway" (Birtles, Ric Formosa) – 6:33
Side B
"Every Day of My Life" (Birtles) – 3:53
"Home on Monday" (Birtles, Shorrock) – 3:53
"The Inner Light" (Goble) – 3:31
"Broke Again" (Birtles, Goble) – 3:27
"Take Me Home" (Birtles) – 3:48

Personnel
Glenn Shorrock – lead vocals, piano 
Graham Goble – guitars, vocals 
Beeb Birtles – guitars, vocals 
David Briggs – guitars 
George McArdle – bass guitar 
Derek Pellicci – drums, percussion

Additional musicians
Ric Formosa – guitar (2, 4, 5 on international version)
Roger McLachlan – bass (4, 8)
Eddy Denton – cor anglais 
Peter Sullivan – piano
Ian Mason – piano
Tony Buchanan – saxophones
Graeme Lyall – flute

Charts

Weekly charts

Year-end charts

Certifications

References

1977 albums
Capitol Records albums
EMI Records albums
Harvest Records albums
Little River Band albums
Albums produced by John Boylan (record producer)